Don't Click may refer to:
 Don't Click (2012 film), a South Korean horror film
 Don't Click (2020 film), a Canadian horror film